The 1985 Chilean telethon was the sixth version of the solidarity campaign conducted in Chile, which took place on 6 and 7 December 1985. The theme of this version was "The Miracle of All." The poster boy was Victor Munoz.

It was a difficult year for the Telethon's Institute and Foundation, due to the 2-year absence of the Telethon (1983 and 1984) and the earthquake that struck the central region (7.6 on the Richter scale). This was the year when Don Francisco formally launched the spin-off disaster relief telethon Chile helps Chile in response to this, and called on the nation to exert its efforts towards rebuilding Valparaiso Province and the Santiago Metropolitan Region.

Even with these difficulties, the Telethon was performed in the same style, with a surprising result of: $ 368,495,845.

TVN, state television, condemned the actions of Los Prisioneros during this telethon, since the group was openly opposed to the military regime. (It is thought because of this 17 years later (2002), the same group criticized the event for its closure, saying the event was allegedly used to financially  benefit sponsoring companies and presenters, words that were considered offensive to the organizers of the Telethon itself)

Sponsors

Artists

Nationals 
  Ginette Acevedo
  Antonio Prieto
  Zalo Reyes
  Miguel Piñera
  Luis Dimas
  Frecuencia Mod
  Peter Rock
  Pachuco y la Cubanacán
  Cristóbal
  Claudia Muñoz
  Alberto Plaza
  Los Prisioneros
  Sol y Medianoche
  Irene Llano
  Miguelo
  Giolito y Su Combo
  Patricio Renán
  Sonora Palacios
  Sergio Lillo
  Jorge Rigó
  Lucho Muñoz
  Luz Eliana
  Los Huasos Quincheros
  José Alfredo Fuentes
  Fernando Ubiergo

International Artistes  
  Nicola Di Bari
  Alejandro Jaén
  Charytin Goyco
  Bravo
  Rubén Juárez
  Hernaldo Zúñiga
  Emilio José
  Orlando Netti
  G.I.T.
  Alejandro Lerner
  Juan Carlos Baglietto
  Aldone
  Leonardo Favio
  Isadora
  Roque Narvaja
  Frank Victory
  La Pequeña Compañía
  Armando Manzanero
  León Gieco
  Gervasio
  Sandra Mihanovich
  Manuela Bravo

Comedians 
 Jorge Romero "Firulete"
 Don Goyo
La Desideria
 El Fatiga
 Mandolino
 Hermanos Campos
 Mino Valdez and company
 Los Eguiguren
 Checho Hirane
 Ruperto
 Hugo Varela
 Los Jaujarana
 Jappening con Ja
 Coco Legrand

Magazine 
 Maitén Montenegro, showwoman
 Enrique González, magician
 Raúl Di Blasio, pianist
 National Folklorical Dance

In Adult Section 
 Maggie Lay
 Maripepa Nieto
 Beatriz Alegret
 Cristina Tocco

Transmission 
 Telenorte
 UCV Televisión
 Televisión Nacional de Chile
 Universidad de Chile Televisión
 Universidad Católica de Chile Televisión

External links 
 
 
 
 
 
 

Telethon
Chilean telethons